Joy House, or Joy Homestead or Joy Farm, may refer to:

Places in the United States 

C. R. Joy House, Keokuk, Iowa, listed on the NRHP in Lee County, Iowa
Joy House (Marshall, Michigan), listed on the NRHP in Calhoun County, Michigan 
Joy Farm, Silver Lake, New Hampshire, listed on the NRHP in Carroll County, New Hampshire
Joy Homestead, Cranston, Rhode Island, listed on the NRHP in Providence County, Rhode Island

Novel and film
Joy House (novel), 1954 novel by Day Keene
Joy House (film), 1964 film starring Jane Fonda and Alain Delon based on the 1954 novel

See also
Joye Cottage, Aiken, South Carolina, listed on the NRHP in Aiken County, South Carolina